Houston Harris (July 10, 1924 – January 20, 1998) was an American professional wrestler, better known by his ring name Bobo Brazil. Credited with breaking down barriers of racial segregation in professional wrestling, Harris is considered one of the first successful African-American professional wrestlers.

Early life 
Houston Harris was born in Little Rock, Arkansas, but later lived in East St. Louis, Illinois, and Benton Harbor, Michigan. His father died when he was seven years old, which resulted in him doing odd jobs such as working on a local fruit farm for fifty cents a container. He played baseball in the Negro leagues for The House of David, where he was discovered to become a wrestler at a steel mill.

Professional wrestling career 
Harris was trained by Joe Savoldi after meeting him at matches at the Naval Armory. Savoldi originally named Harris, BuBu Brasil, "The South American Giant," where he wrestled using a sequined satin cape stitched together by his wife, but a promoter misprinted his first name as "Bobo" in an advertisement, and the name stuck with Harris throughout the entirety of his career. During the time, segregation in the South normally limited African-American wrestlers to only wrestling other African-American wrestlers; Harris proved so popular that promoters put aside their prejudices in order to make money.

Brazil's first recorded match was on March 29, 1948 in Benton Harbor, wrestling as "Houston Harris, The Black Panther" against Armand Myers to a 30 minute draw. Harris was taught by Joe Savoldi to "be an honest athlete in the ring and never to take shortcuts on anybody to win a match. He was instilled to be a crowd’s friend right to the end." Finding success in Detroit, which was an urban center, Brazil developed a fanbase among both the black and white populace with his modesty and stylish dress and professionalism, making him a big draw and an appealing babyface to both races of fans. Although loved by fans, it didn't stop Brazil from dealing with bigotry and discrimination during that time. In the era when Harris ascended to stardom, African American fans were forced to sit in areas that made it hard to see Bobo matches; even Harris himself was banned from going to restaurants, hotels, and even wrestling in certain territories due to the color of his skin. In the early 50's, he also performed in Japan.

Brazil would have many matches with competitors such as Killer Kowalski, Dick the Bruiser, Johnny Valentine, Haystacks Calhoun and The Sheik, who feuded with Brazil over the course of several decades, with a variety of their matches being acclaimed bloody matchups. These and other rivals would all fall victim to Brazil's finishing maneuver, the Coco Butt, with the move also breaking racial barriers. Brazil also once wrestled Bill Miller to a draw, and challenged Bruno Sammartino for the WWWF World Heavyweight Championship in a battle of two top babyface competitors. On October 18, 1962, Brazil defeated "Nature Boy" Buddy Rogers by hitting him in the groin causing Rogers to be unable to continue. Brazil refused the championship and they met a couple of weeks later and Rogers won. At the time, the promoters were working a gimmick where the champion would be hit in the groin and the challenger wouldn't accept the title. The same scenario occurred in Toronto two weeks earlier with Bruno Sammartino and Rogers. Neither Brazil, nor Sammartino were officially recognized by the NWA as having won the World Heavyweight Championship. (This distinction is usually given to Ron Simmons, the first recognized African American world champion after winning the WCW World Heavyweight Championship).

On October 9, 1970, Brazil and El Mongol defeated Mr. Ito and The Great Ota in the first racially mixed match in Atlanta history. Brazil served as a mentor to wrestler "Soulman" Rocky Johnson and was inspirational to boxer Joe Frazier. Brazil's manager was James Dudley, the first African American to be in charge of a major arena in the United States. Dudley would run to the ring waving a towel, as Brazil followed behind. Brazil retired in 1993 after a four-decade career. His last official match was in Chicago, Illinois against Kelly Kiniski, son of rival Gene Kiniski. Brazil was inducted into the WWF Hall of Fame class of 1994 by longtime rival Ernie Ladd. The following year, Brazil inducted Ladd into the WWF Hall of Fame.

Personal life and death 
Harris had a wife and six children. After retiring from wrestling, he ran a restaurant called Bobo's Grill which lasted for more than 20 years.

His son Karl (born 1952) wrestles as Bobo Brazil Jr. in the independent circuit. His brother wrestled as Hank James.

Harris died on January 20, 1998, at the Lakeland Medical Center in St. Joseph, Michigan. He had been admitted to the hospital on January 14 and used a wheelchair after suffering a series of strokes.

Championships and accomplishments 
 Big Time Wrestling (Detroit)
 NWA United States Heavyweight Championship (Detroit version) (9 times)
 NWA World Tag Team Championship (Detroit version) (8 times) – with Art Thomas (1), Bill Miller (1), Athol Layton (1), The Stomper (1), Tony Marino (3) and Fred Curry (1)
Big Time Wrestling (San Francisco)
 NWA United States Heavyweight Championship (San Francisco version) (1 time)
 Championship Wrestling from Florida
 NWA Florida Tag Team Championship (2 times) – with Sweet Brown Sugar (1) and Dusty Rhodes (1)
 Eastern Sports Association
 ESA North American Heavyweight Championship (1 time)
 Japan Wrestling Association
 NWA International Heavyweight Championship (2 times)
 Maple Leaf Wrestling
 NWA Canadian Open Tag Team Championship (1 time) – with Whipper Billy Watson
 NWA United States Heavyweight Championship (Toronto version) (1 time)
 Mid-Atlantic Championship Wrestling
 NWA United States Heavyweight Championship (Mid-Atlantic version) (1 time)
 Midwest Wrestling Association (Ohio)
 MWA Ohio Heavyweight Championship (1 time)
 MWA Ohio Tag Team Championship (3 times) – with Frankie Talaber
 National Wrestling Alliance
 NWA Hall of Fame (Class of 2013)
 NWA Hollywood Wrestling/Worldwide Wrestling Associates
 NWA Americas Heavyweight Championship (3 times)
 NWA "Beat the Champ" Television Championship (1 time)
 NWA International Television Tag Team Championship (4 times) – with Wilbur Snyder (2), Sandor Szabo (1), and Primo Carnera (1)
 NWA Pacific Coast Heavyweight Championship (Los Angeles version) (1 time)
 WWA World Heavyweight Championship (2 times)
 Professional Wrestling Hall of Fame and Museum
 Television Era (Class of 2008)
 Pro Wrestling Illustrated
 PWI Editor's Award (1998)
 Superstars of Wrestling
 SoW United States Heavyweight Championship (1 time)
 World Wrestling Association (Indianapolis)
 WWA World Heavyweight Championship (2 times)
 WWA World Tag Team Championship (1 time) – with Chris Carter
 World Wide Wrestling Federation/World Wrestling Federation
 WWWF United States Heavyweight Championship (7 times)
 WWF Hall of Fame (Class of 1994)
 Wrestling Observer Newsletter
 Wrestling Observer Newsletter Hall of Fame (Class of 1996)
 Other championships
 World Negro Heavyweight Championship (2 times)

References

External links 
 
 Professional Wrestling Hall of Fame profile (archived)
 

1924 births
1998 deaths
20th-century American male actors
20th-century professional wrestlers
African-American male professional wrestlers
American male professional wrestlers
NWA/WCW/WWE United States Heavyweight Champions
Professional wrestlers from Arkansas
Professional Wrestling Hall of Fame and Museum
Sportspeople from Little Rock, Arkansas
WWE Hall of Fame inductees
NWA Florida Tag Team Champions
NWA "Beat the Champ" Television Champions
NWA Canadian Open Tag Team Champions
NWA United States Heavyweight Champions (Toronto version)
NWA Americas Heavyweight Champions
NWA International Heavyweight Champions